Michael Rubin (born 1971) is a senior fellow at the American Enterprise Institute (AEI). He previously worked as an official at the Pentagon, where he dealt with issues relating to the Middle East, and as political adviser to the Coalition Provisional Authority.

Biography

Early life 

A native of Philadelphia, Rubin earned both his B.S. in biology (1994) and his Ph.D. in history (1999) from Yale University. His dissertation, The Making of Modern Iran, 1858–1909: Communications, Telegraph and Society won Yale's John Addison Porter Prize.

Career
Rubin has lectured in history at Yale University, Hebrew University, Johns Hopkins University, and worked as visiting lecturer at Universities of Sulaymaniyah, Salahuddin, and Duhok, in the Kurdistan Region of Iraq. From 2002 until 2004, Rubin served as a staff adviser on Iran and Iraq for the Office of the Secretary of Defense. Between 2003 and 2004, Rubin worked as a political adviser to the Coalition Provisional Authority in Baghdad.

Between 2004 and 2009, he was editor of the Middle East Quarterly. He has received fellowships from the Council on Foreign Relations, and the Carnegie Council for Ethics in International Affairs.

Since 2007 and 2021, he taught senior U.S. Army, U.S. Marine, and U.S. Navy leadership prior to their deployment to Iraq, the Persian Gulf, and Afghanistan as a lecturer at the Naval Postgraduate School.

Rubin is also a Contributing Editor for the online national security website 19FortyFive.

Controversies

Human Rights Watch criticisms 
Rubin has repeatedly criticized Human Rights Watch, Amnesty International, and the American Friends Service Committee for political bias and conflicts of interest. In 2014, for example, he questioned whether policymakers could trust Human Rights Watch reports after the group held a fundraiser in Saudi Arabia. That same year, he alleged Human Rights Watch had incorporated information that was provided by Alkarama, an organization founded by a U.S.-designated Al Qaeda financier. He also accused Human Rights Watch of fabricating statistics.

UAE/Nasser bin Ghaith controversy
In 2014, the Intercept, in an article about an alleged UAE campaign through the public relations firm Camstoll, mentioned Rubin as a "target" to "plant" stories favorable to the UAE government. According to a Human Rights Watch analyst, Rubin traveled to the UAE to meet senior government ministers in 2014.

In 2016, Rubin wrote an article on the case of Emirati economist Nasser bin Ghaith, one of the UAE Five, criticizing Human Rights Watch's calling for bin Ghaith's release. Bin Ghaith had been arrested in Abu Dhabi in August 2015 for online comments critical of the Egyptian and UAE governments, including "tweets and images ridiculing the Egyptian president and government" and "claiming that he was tortured and unjustly accused during his previous trial", according to HRW and the  Scholars at Risk Network. Rubin criticized HRW for "cherry-picking" and not mentioning that bin Ghaith was accused of membership in the Emirati Ummah Party. HRW amended their report to include the Ummah party accusation which they said had been omitted from the English translation due to an error. Bin Ghaith's family denied those accusations, saying the Ummah party unilaterally appointed bin Ghaith after he was already in prison and one day before the trial session in order to harm him.  Rubin reiterated the claims in subsequent articles. 

Mansoureh Mills, an analyst at Amnesty International and Ahmed Mansoor accused Rubin of having been paid by the UAE to write the piece on Ghaith. According to Nicholas McGeehan, the analyst from HRW on this case, emails to Yousef Al Otaiba from advisors that were leaked mention Rubin's articles as demonstrating success in encouraging favorable articles. In a Twitter exchange with McGeehan, Rubin denied any relationship with the UAE and noted his articles are cited by governments from Iran to Morocco.

Turkey coup attempt and bounty
In June 2017, Recep Tayyip Erdoğan filed a criminal complaint against Rubin in Turkish courts, accusing him of "supporting and committing offenses for the Fethullahist Terror Organization". In December 2017, Turkish national offered a reward of three million Turkish lira (almost $800,000) for help in delivering Rubin to Turkey to answer Turkish terrorism allegations in connection with the 2016 Turkish coup d'état attempt.

Russia and Ukraine
On November 11, 2022, the Ministry of Foreign Affairs of the Russian Federation added Rubin to its sanctions list because of his writing on behalf of Ukraine and in opposition to Russian foreign policy.

Ethiopia
Since the start of the Tigray War in November 2020, Rubin has written a number of editorials critical of the Ethiopian government on various topics, accusing it of exploiting Kenya and Somalia, calling for International Criminal Court proceedings against Ethiopian Prime Minister Abiy Ahmed, and predicting the dissolution of the country, a coup, a genocide, and war on Somaliland. In September 2022, Rubin wrote an article calling on the US to support the TPLF against the government of Ethiopia, by supplying weapons to the group, imposing a no-fly zone, and establishing relationship with Ethiopian regions by-passing the federal government.

Bibliography 
Seven Pillars: What Really Causes Instability in the Middle East? (co-editor, with Brian Katulus, AEI Press, 2019)
Kurdistan Rising (AEI Press, 2016)
Dancing with the Devil: The Perils of Engaging Rogue Regimes. New York: Encounter Books, 2014. 
The Shi'ites of the Middle East (co-author, AEI Press, 2014)
Dissent and Reform in the Arab World (editor, AEI Press, 2008)
Eternal Iran: Continuity and Chaos (co-author with Patrick Clawson). London: Palgrave Macmillan, 2005.
Into the Shadows: Radical Vigilantes in Khatami's Iran. Washington: Washington Institute for Near East Policy, 2001.

References

External links
 Michael Rubin's official website
 Rubin's biography – from the American Enterprise Institute
 Articles at National Interest
 Articles at Washington Examiner
 Articles at Commentary
 

1971 births
Living people
Yale University alumni
American Enterprise Institute
Middle East Forum
Place of birth missing (living people)
Historians of Iran
Middle Eastern studies in the United States
21st-century American historians
21st-century American male writers
American male non-fiction writers